Events in the year 1998 in  Turkey.

Parliament
20th Parliament of Turkey

Incumbents
President – Süleyman Demirel
Prime Minister – Mesut Yılmaz 
Leader of the opposition –
Necmettin Erbakan (up to 16 January)
Recai Kutan (from 14 May)

Ruling party and the main opposition
 Ruling party 
Motherland Party (ANAP) with coalition partners Democratic Left Party (DSP) and Democrat Turkey Party (DTP)
 Main opposition 
 Welfare Party (RP) (up to 16 January)
Virtue Party (from 14 May)

Cabinet
 55th government of Turkey

Events
3 January – First Wind farm of Turkey in İzmir Province
17 January – Welfare Party (main party of the 54th government of Turkey) was closed by the court
17 February – First female military pilots graduated from the military academy
10 May – Galatasaray won the championship of the Turkish football league
27 June – The 6.3  Adana–Ceyhan earthquake shook the area with a maximum Mercalli intensity of IX (Violent), leaving at least 145 dead and 1,500–1,600 injured.
1 July – Agreement with the International Money Fund
18 August – Operation against the Turkish mafia. Subsequently, relations between some politicians and mafia were revealed
16 September – Atilla Ateş, the land forces commander, accused Syria of "hosting terrorists."
6 November – High court deposed Recep Tayyip Erdoğan, the future prime minister, as İstanbul Mayor

Deaths

January 
 January 11 - Aydan Siyavuş, basketball coach and player (b. 1947)
 January 14 - Safiye Ayla, singers of Turkish classical music (b. 1907)

February

March 
 March 16 - Pertev Naili Boratav, folklorist and researcher of folk literature (b. 1907) 
 March 17 - Ecmel Kutay, general and 24th Mayor of Istanbul (b. 1927) 
 March 19 - Sabiha Rüştü Bozcalı, visual artist and illustrator (b. 1904)

April 
 April 12 - Hanzade Osmanoğlu, Ottoman princess (b. 1923)

May 
 May 15 - Naim Talu, economist, politician and former Prime Minister of Turkey (b. 1919)
 May 16 - Sevim Tanürek, singers of Turkish classical music (b. 1934)

June 
 June 26 - Hacı Sabancı, businessman and philanthropist  (b. 1935)

July 
 July 17 - Sedat Celasun, general and former General Commander of the Gendarmerie of Turkey (b. 1915)
 July 26 - Zeki Kuneralp, diplomat (b. 1914)

August  
 August 7 - Bekir Büyükarkın, poet and novelist (b. 1921)
 August 23 - Ahmet Hamdi Boyacıoğlu, judge and former president  Constitutional Court of Turkey (b. 1920)
 August 31 - Sabiha Gökçül Erbay, teacher and politician (b. 1900)

September 
 September 1 - Osman F. Seden, film director, screenwriter and film producer (b. 1924)
 September 5 - Lütfü Aksoy, footballer (b. 1911)
 September 7 - Şaban Kartal, footballer (b. 1952)
 September 13 - Necdet Calp, civil servant and politician (b. 1922)

October 
 October 5 - Ahmet Uzel, composer (b. 1930)

November 
 November 8 - Erol Taş, actor  Constitutional Court of Turkey (b. 1928)

December

Gallery

See also
1997-98 1.Lig
Turkey in the Eurovision Song Contest 1998
Turkey at the 1998 Winter Olympics

References

 
Years of the 20th century in Turkey
Turkey
Turkey
Turkey